Lan Lixin (born 14 February 1979) is a female Chinese middle-distance runner.

On 18 October 1997 in Shanghai she ran the 1500 metres in 3:53.97 minutes. This ranks her eighth in the world of all time, behind Qu Yunxia, Jiang Bo, Lang Yinglai, Wang Junxia, Tatyana Kazankina, Yin Lili and Paula Ivan.

At the 1998 World Junior Championships she won the 1500 metres.

Achievements

References

1979 births
Living people
Chinese female middle-distance runners
World Athletics record holders (relay)